Charlotte Tillar Schexnayder (December 25, 1923 – December 11, 2020) was an American journalist and politician who served in the Arkansas House of Representatives from the 74th district from 1985 to 1999. In 2019 she was inducted into the Arkansas Women's Hall of Fame. Together with her late husband, Melvin J. Schexnayder, she owned and published the Dumas Clarion weekly newspaper in Dumas, Arkansas from 1954 to 1998.

Schexnayder died on December 11, 2020, in Little Rock, Arkansas at the age of 96.

References

1923 births
2020 deaths
People from Dumas, Arkansas
People from Tillar, Arkansas
Editors of Arkansas newspapers
Democratic Party members of the Arkansas House of Representatives
Women state legislators in Arkansas
21st-century American women